The 2012 Segunda División play-offs took place in June 2012. The Segunda División promotion phase (known as Promoción de ascenso) was the second phase of 2011–12 Segunda División and was to determine the third team which promoted to 2012–13 La Liga. Teams placed between 3rd and 6th position (excluding reserve teams) took part in the promotion play-offs.

Regulations were similar that previous season: fifth placed faced against the fourth, while the sixth positioned team faced against the third. In case of a tied eliminatory there were extra time, once finished it, this season introduced that there wouldn't be penalty shoot-out and the winner would be the best positioned team.  The first leg of the semi-finals was played on 6 June with the best positioned team playing at home the second leg was played on 10 June. The final was also two-legged, with the first leg on 13 June and the second leg on 16 June, with the best positioned team also playing at home the second leg. Real Valladolid and AD Alcorcón played the final phase where Valladolid was winner and promoted to La Liga after two years of absence. Córdoba CF and Hércules CF were eliminated in semifinals.

Road to the play-offs

League table

Valladolid
Real Valladolid was the only team to be assured a spot in this phase several matchdays before, doing so on 16 May 2012. They were fighting together with Celta de Vigo for the second place to earn direct promotion, and eventually repeated the play-off appearance from the previous season. 

An historical La Liga team, Valladolid made solid regular season (82 points), fighting with Celta for the remaining place for direct promotion. However, after a draw in the penultimate match against AD Alcorcón (which was also fighting for a play-off spot) they didn't depend by himself for direct promotion: Celta played last round against Córdoba CF, both only needed a draw, and drew 0–0 as their opponents were also favoured by that outcome; foreseeing this situation, Valladolid didn't try to opt for the second place and lost the last match 1–3 at home against CD Guadalajara. 

Valladolid's last participation in La Liga was in 2009–10. Valladolid spent 40 seasons in the top division: from 1948–64 except 1958–59 and 1961–62, and from 1980–2004 except 1992–93, and lately from 2007–10. It ranked 14th in the all-time La Liga table (Racing de Santander surpassed it after 2011–12 La Liga). They were in the category since 2010–11.

Background at 2011–12 Segunda División:

Alcorcón
AD Alcorcón qualified to the playoffs in the last matchday (3 June 2012), like Hércules CF and Córdoba, after winning 1–0 away against CD Numancia.

Alcorcón was then a "modest team" that since its foundation in 1971 had spent in the lower leagues until 2010. They are well remembered for its achievement in 2009–10 season, when still in Segunda División B, it made worldwide headlines after defeated neighbours giants Real Madrid in Copa del Rey. Since then, it was popularized the expression "Alcorconazo" meaning this team makes a surprise against a successful rival. In that season they were champions in Segunda División B Group 2, and they played play-offs to promote to Segunda División. They were eliminated by Granada CF for winners phase and they entered to next phases and eliminated Pontevedra CF and Ontinyent CF.

Alcorcón had a regular 2011–12, being placed in the quiet zone almost all season but winning several consecutive matches in the spring. In the 41st round, they made another "Alcorconazo" and drew 1–1 at Valladolid, which meant the opposition did not depend exclusively on itself in the last matchday for direct promotion.

Alcorcón had never been in La Liga. They were in the second division since last season, 2010–11.

Background at 2011–12 Segunda División:

Hércules
Hércules qualified to this phase in the last matchday (3 June 2012) like Alcorcón and Córdoba, after a necessary win (2–1) at SD Huesca (UD Almería could qualify instead if Hércules didn't win), and sought to promote immediately after being relegated from La Liga.

The team's early season was a spectacular one, gathering 28 points out of 33 in the first eleven matches, and leading for ten rounds during the 2011 autumn. Since November, however, it started to combine wins and losses, remaining however in the play-off zone until the end of league.

Hércules' last participation in La Liga was in last season (2010–11), having spent 20 seasons in La Liga: period 1935–42 (no football between 1936–39 due to the Spanish Civil War), 1945–46, from 1954–56, 1966–67, from 1974–82, 1984–85, 1996–97 and 2010–11. Hércules was 22nd in the all-time La Liga table, 13 points over long-standing rival and neighbours Elche CF. They were in Segunda División only since this related season. 

Background at 2011–12 Segunda División:

Córdoba
Córdoba qualified to this stage in the last matchday (3 June 2012), as Hércules and Alcorcón, after a 0–0 away draw against Celta de Vigo which was heavily criticised by Real Valladolid. 

At time, an historical second division outfit, the Andalusia side's last top level participation was 40 years ago – in which it managed to defeat FC Barcelona and draw against Real Madrid at El Arcángel – and it finished fifth in the main category in 1964–65. It had a short spell in the third level in the 2000s, returning in 2007 after defeating Pontevedra CF and SD Huesca. 

Córdoba had a regular 2011–12 season, being in the play-off area for some matches, and fighting last mid with neighbouring Almería for the final sixth-place, eventually succeeding.

Córdoba's last participation in La Liga was in 1971–72. The club spent a further seven seasons in the main category, from 1962–69. It ranked 38th in the all-time La Liga table (being surpassed by Levante UD at the end of 2011–12's top division). They were in Segunda División since 2007–08.

Background at 2011–12 Segunda División:

Promotion play-offs

Semifinals

First leg

Second leg

Final

First leg

Second leg

See also 
 2011–12 Segunda División
 2012–13 La Liga
 2012–13 Segunda División

References

2011-12
play-offs
1